Spark is an Indian drama film written and directed by V. K. Singh, produced by Rekha Yadav and Naresh Gupta. The film stars Rajneesh Duggal and Subhashree Ganguly in lead roles, with Govind Namdeo, Ashutosh Rana, Rohit Raj and Rati Agnihotri in supporting roles. The film was released on 10 October 2014.

Cast 
 Rajniesh Duggal as Arjun
 Mansha Bahl as Nimita
 Subhashree Ganguly as Anupama
 Ashutosh Rana as Rana and Rana's father (double role)
 Govind Namdeo
 Rohit Raj as Tikkam
 Rati Agnihotri
 Manoj Joshi
 Ranjeet

Soundtrack 

The soundtrack was composed by Lalit Pandit, Monty Sharma and  Nitz 'N' Sony, while the lyrics were written by Sameer, Chi Chi and Naresh Gupta.

References

External links 
 
 

2014 films
2010s Hindi-language films
Films scored by Monty Sharma